Angus Gardner (born 24 August 1984) is an Australian rugby union  professional referee who was appointed to the Super Rugby referees panel in 2012. His first match in Super Rugby was between the Queensland Reds and Melbourne Rebels at Suncorp Stadium in March of that year.

Gardner took up refereeing in 1999 at the age of fifteen, and became a full-time referee in 2015. He was appointed to his first test match in November 2011, which was an Oceania Cup match between Papua New Guinea and Vanuatu in Port Morseby.

Gardner was appointed to the IRB Junior World Championship in 2012 and 2014, and took charge of the semi-final between England and Ireland in 2014.

In 2015, Gardner was selected as an assistant referee at the 2015 Rugby World Cup.

He refereed the 2018 Super Rugby Final between the Crusaders and the Lions in Christchurch.

In 2019, Gardner was selected to referee at the 2019 Rugby World Cup.

Honours
During the 2018 World Rugby Awards, Angus Gardner received the "World Rugby Referee of the Year" award.

References

1984 births
Living people
Australian rugby union referees
Super Rugby referees
ARU referees
The Rugby Championship referees
Six Nations Championship referees
Rugby World Cup referees